A pen is a writing instrument which applies ink to a surface, usually paper.

Pen may also refer to:

Animals and animal husbandry
 Pen (enclosure), enclosure for holding animals
 Pen, an adult female swan
 Gladius (cephalopod), or pen, a hard internal bodypart found in certain cephalopods
 Pen (Jamaican cattle farm), a historic livestock farm on the Island of Jamaica
 Sea pen, an order of Cnidarians in the class Octocorallia

People

 Jan Pen (1921–2010), Dutch economist
 Luke Pen (1960–2002), Australian biologist and environmental scientist
 Ue-Li Pen (born 1967), Canadian astrophysicist
 Yehuda Pen (1854–1937), Lithuanian Jewish painter and art teacher

Other uses
 Pen, India, a place
 Pen (play), by David Marshall Grant
 "The Pen", an episode of Seinfeld
 Olympus Pen, a camera
 Autoinjector pen, a medical device to deliver a dose of a drug
 Insulin pen
 Submarine pen, a type of submarine base

See also
 PEN (disambiguation)
 Penn (disambiguation)
 Pens (disambiguation)
 Penitentiary, or prison
 Pen register, or dialed number recorder